The Commitment 2 is the second and final extended play by English rapper Cadet. It was released on 21 July 2017 via digital download. The EP has features from Konan, Ghetts, Sangeet, and Shakka.

Track listing

Personnel
Credits for the Commitment 2 adapted from AllMusic.

Cadet - Primary Artist
Ghetts - Featured Artist, Rap
Konan - Choir/Chorus, Featured Artist, Vocals (Background)
Sangeet - Choir/Chorus, Featured Artist, Vocals (Background)
Shakka - Choir/Chorus, Featured Artist, Vocals

References

Cadet (rapper) albums
2017 EPs
Hip hop EPs